Preble High School is a public high school in the Green Bay, Wisconsin School District.  The school serves students from Green Bay, Bellevue, and New Franken. The name comes from the former town of Preble, which is now part of northeastern Green Bay, and New Franken, Wisconsin.

History 

Preble High School opened in 1955, with a campus of both junior (7th-9th grade) and senior (10th-12th grade) high schools housed in separate buildings. The junior high was phased out with the opening of Edison Junior High (now Edison Middle) School in 1970. In 1986, Green Bay Public Schools changed to a format of middle (6th-8th grade) and high (9th-12th grade) schools.

On August 8, 2014, a fire occurred in a gymnasium at Preble High School, delaying the start of classes. The fire was a result of the spontaneous combustion of rags soaked with gym floor resurfacing product. It was the second largest fire in Green Bay history. The estimated damage was about 7.5 million dollars. A new field house with an indoor track opened in November 2014.

Preble, which was designed for roughly 1700 students, currently holds more than 2100, making it the second largest high school in Wisconsin as of 2016. A referendum to create a new school in northeastern Brown County, Wisconsin to alleviate overcrowding was defeated by a 2-to-1 margin on November 6, 2006.

Athletics 
Preble's athletic teams are known as the Hornets, and compete in the Fox River Classic Conference of the Wisconsin Interscholastic Athletic Association. The Hornets have won nine WIAA championships, six of which came from gymnastics.

Extra-curricular activities

Music and drama
Preble's music and drama program puts on a variety of plays and musicals throughout the year. The school also has two competitive show choirs, the mixed-gender Center Stage and the female Rendezvous. In October 2010, Center Stage was voted in a fan poll run by Parade Magazine as one of the top three favorite show choirs in the country.

Sting Cancer 
In 2004, a faculty member who is a cancer survivor and students at Preble founded Sting Cancer, a club for raising awareness of cancer and offering support to those affected by it. Over a decade later, the club has spread to nearly 30 other schools in northeast Wisconsin.

Notable alumni
Tony Bennett, men's basketball coach at the University of Virginia
Bob Kroll, former NFL player for the Green Bay Packers
Kevin Stemke, former NFL player
Ron Vander Kelen, former NFL player

References

External links
Official website

High schools in Green Bay, Wisconsin
Educational institutions established in 1955
Public high schools in Wisconsin
1955 establishments in Wisconsin